TA or ta may refer to:

Places 
 Ta (island), Federated States of Micronesia
 Ta, Chiang Rai, Thailand
 Ta, Iran, Kordestan village
 Ta River, Virginia, US
 Province of Taranto, Italy
 Tel Aviv, Israel

People with the name
 Tạ, a Vietnamese surname (including a list of persons with the name)
 T.A. All Day, an American rapper

Arts, entertainment and media

Music
 TA (album), 2002 album by the post-rock band Trans Am
 Ta, name of a note in the solfège scale

Newspapers
 Tages-Anzeiger, of Switzerland
 Telemarksavisa, of Norway
 Thüringer Allgemeine, of Germany

Other media
 TextAmerica, a moblog community photo website
 Third Age, a time period in J. R. R. Tolkien's Middle-earth
 Total Annihilation, a 1997 video game

Business and finance

 Technical analysis, the study of the trading history of a market to predict future prices
 Trading as, a term used to denote a business using a name other than the name of its owner(s)

Language
 Ta (cuneiform), a cuneiform sign
 Ta (Indic), a consonant in Brahmic writing systems
 Ṭa (Indic), another consonant in Brahmic scripts
 Ta (Javanese) (ꦠ), a letter in the Javanese script
 Ta (kana), the た or タ kana in the Japanese language
 Tāʾ ت or ṭāʾ ط, an Arabic letter
 Tamil language (ISO 639-1 language code "ta")

Organizations

Companies
 TA Associates, a private equity firm based in Boston
 TACA Airlines, an international airline headquartered in San Salvador, El Salvador (IATA code TA)
 Travelcenters of America, a North American truck stop chain

Military
 Territorial Army (India), an Army Reserve
 Territorial Army (United Kingdom), now Army Reserve

Schools
 Takoma Academy, a private school in Takoma Park, Maryland, United States
 Talmudical Academy of Baltimore
 Thayer Academy, a private school in Braintree, Massachusetts, United States
 Tuscaloosa Academy, a private school in Tuscaloosa, Alabama, United States

Other organizations
 Telluride Association, an American non-profit organization that provides education programs
 Tennis Australia, the Australian tennis body
 Transportation Alternatives, an advocacy NGO based in New York City

Science and technology

Biology, medicine, and psychology
 Takayasu's arteritis
Terminologia Anatomica, an international standard for human anatomical nomenclature
 Tibialis anterior muscle
 Transactional analysis, a psychoanalytic theory of psychology developed by psychiatrist Eric Berne during the late 1950s
 Transversus abdominis muscle

Physics and chemistry 
 Tantalum, symbol Ta, a chemical element
 Teraampere, a multiple of the SI unit of electric current, the ampere
 Transient absorption spectroscopy, a type of time-resolved spectroscopy

Other uses in science and technology
 EMC TA, an American diesel-powered locomotive
 Technician or technical assistant, in laboratories
 Teraannum, a unit of time equal to 1012 years
 Terminal adapter, a device that connects a terminal computer to an ISDN network
 Thematic analysis, a research method in social and applied sciences
 Traffic announcement (radio data systems), a feature of radio data systems

Other uses 
 TA Luft, a German air pollution control regulation
 Teaching assistant, an individual who assists a university or college professor with instructional responsibilities
 Teaching assistant (United Kingdom), a classroom aide in schools
 TrueAchievements, a website that tracks player's Xbox achievements and Gamerscore

See also 
 T & A (disambiguation)